Beatrice "Bea" Proo is a former council member and mayor of Pico Rivera, California.

Proo was elected to the Pico Rivera City Council in 1992, and was re-elected in 1997 and 2001. She has served as the city's mayor on three occasions. Proo has been a member of the Southern California Association of Governments, an executive board member of the Gateway Council of Governments, president of the League of California Cities' Los Angeles Division, and a president and board member of the Tri-Cities Regional Occupational Program. She was also nominated as the first ever Woman of the Year in 1987 by the California State Legislature's 59th district.

Proo, a former teacher and school principal, holds a Bachelor's degree in Education from Mount St. Mary's College and has served as a member and president of the El Rancho Unified School District Board of Trustees and is the current and founding Chairman of the Board of Pacific Western National Bank in Pico Rivera since 1980.

References

Mayors of places in California
Women mayors of places in California
Living people
People from Pico Rivera, California
Mount St. Mary's University (Los Angeles) alumni
Year of birth missing (living people)
Mayors of Pico Rivera, California
21st-century American women